Athanasios, also transliterated as Athnasious, Athanase or Atanacio, is a Greek male name which means "immortal". In modern Greek everyday use, it is commonly shortened to Thanasis (Θανάσης), Thanos (Θάνος), Sakis (Σάκης), Nasos (Νάσος), Athan (Αθαν) or Athos (Aθως).

The female version of the name is Athanasia (Greek: Αθανασία), shortened to Sia (Σία) or Nancy (Νάνσυ)

Notable people with this name include:

Religious figures 
 Athanasius of Alexandria (ca. 296/298–373), Christian saint, Coptic pope, theologian
 Pope Athanasius II of Alexandria (died 496), Coptic pope from 490 to 496
 Athanasius I Gammolo (died 631), Patriarch of Antioch, and head of the Syriac Orthodox Church of Antioch from 595 until his death
 Athanasius II Baldoyo (died 686), Patriarch of Antioch, and head of the Syriac Orthodox Church from 683 until his death
 Athanasius Sandalaya, Patriarch of Antioch, and head of the Syriac Orthodox Church from 756 until 758
 Athanasius I (bishop of Naples) (died 872), Italian bishop
 Athanasius of Naples (died 898), bishop and Duke of Naples
 Athanasius IV of Salh (died 1002), Patriarch of Antioch, and head of the Syriac Orthodox Church from 986 until his death
 Athanasius the Athonite (c. 920–c. 1003), Byzantine monk and saint who founded the monastic community on Mount Athos
 Athanasius VI bar Khamoro (died 1129), Patriarch of Antioch, and head of the Syriac Orthodox Church from 1091 until his death
 Pope Athanasius III of Alexandria, Coptic pope from 1250 to 1261
 Athanasius I of Constantinople (1230–1310), Greek Patriarch of Constantinople, Eastern Orthodox saint
 Patriarch Athanasius III of Alexandria, Greek Patriarch of Alexandria between 1276 and 1316
 Athanasius the Meteorite (1302–1380), Greek monk who founded the Monastery of Great Meteoron in Meteora, Greece
 Patriarch Athanasius IV of Alexandria, Greek Patriarch of Alexandria between 1417 and 1425
 Athanasius II of Constantinople, last Greek Patriarch (1450–1453) of an independent Constantinople
 Athanasius, Metropolitan of Moscow (died in the 1570s), Metropolitan of Moscow and all Russia from 1566 to 1568, writer and icon painter
 Athanasius II Dabbas (died 1619), Greek Patriarch of Antioch from 1611 to his death
 Athanasius of Brest-Litovsk (died 1648), Lithuanian martyr of the Russian Orthodox Church
 Athanasius III of Constantinople (1597–1654), Patriarch of Constantinople in 1634, 1635 and 1652
 Athanasius III Dabbas (1647–1724), Greek Patriarch of Antioch and Archbishop of Cyprus
 Athanasius IV of Constantinople, Ecumenical Patriarch of Constantinople in 1679
 Athanasius of Attalia (died 1700), Orthodox martyr of Smyrna
 Athanasius V of Constantinople, Greek Patriarch of Constantinople from 1709 to 1711
 Athanasios Parios (1722–1813), Greek hieromonk, theologian, philosopher, educator and hymnographer
 Athanasius V Matar, Patriarch of the Melkite Greek Catholic Church for a few months in 1813
 Athanasius Schneider (born 1961), Roman Catholic bishop
 Athanasiy Velyki (1918–1982), Ukrainian Basilian priest, historian, member of the Shevchenko Scientific Society

Academics 

 Athanasios Angelopoulos (born 1939), Greek professor of theology
 Athanasios Asimakopulos (1930–1990), Canadian economist
 Athanasios Kafkalides (1919–1989), Greek neuropsychiatrist
 Athanasius Kircher (1602–1680), German Jesuit scholar and polymath
 Athanasios Moulakis (1945–2015), Greek Professor of Government
 Athanasios Rousopoulos (1823–1898), professor
 Athanasios Psalidas (1767–1829), author, scholar and one of the most renowned figures of the modern Greek Enlightenment
 Athanasios Stageiritis, professor of Greek language at the Imperial Academy in Vienna
 Athanasios Tsakalidis (born 1950), Greek computer scientist
 Athanasios Pantelous (born 1978), Greek associate professor in actuarial science and financial mathematics

Soldiers, revolutionaries and politicians 

 Athanasios Diakos (1788–1821), Greek military commander during the Greek War of Independence
 Athanasios Dimitrakopoulos (1936–2022), Greek politician
 Athanasios Eftaxias (1849–1931), former Prime Minister of Greece
 Athanasios Exadaktylos (1869–1936), Greek Army general
 Athanasios Frangou (1864–1923), Greek Army officer
 Athanasios Kanakaris (1760–1824), Greek revolutionary and politician
 Athanasios Kanakaris-Roufos (1830–1902), politician, mayor of the city of Patras
 Athanasios Kanellopoulos (1923–1994), Greek politician, Deputy Prime Minister of Greece (1990–1992)
 Athanasios Klaras (1905–1945), military leader of ELAS (nom de guerre Aris Velouchiotis)
 Athanasios Miaoulis (1815–1867), former Prime Minister of Greece
 Athanasios N. Miaoulis (1865–1936), former Mayor of Piraeustu
 Thanos Mikroutsikos (1947–2019), Greek songwriter and politician
 Atanas Paparizov (born 1951), Bulgarian politician and Member of the European Parliament
 Athanasios Pipis (died 1821), revolutionary in the Greek War of Independence
 Thanos Plevris (born 1977), Greek politician
 Athanasios Roussopoulos (1903–1983), Greek politician
 Athanasios Tsakalov (died 1851), Greek revolutionary against Ottoman rule, co-founder of the Filiki Eteria secret revolutionary organization
 Athanasios Tsaldaris (1921–1997), Greek politician, Speaker of the Hellenic Parliament at various times from 1989–1993

Artists and entertainers 
 Athanasios Christopoulos (1772–1847), Greek poet
 Thanos Kalliris (born 1962), Greek pop singer
 Thanos Mikroutsikos (born 1947–2020), Greek songwriter and politician
 Panas Myrny (1849–1920), Ukrainian prose writer and playwright
 Thanos Petrelis (born 1975), Greek pop singer
 Sakis Tolis (born 1972), Greek musician best known as the vocalist and rhythm guitarist of Rotting Christ

Athletes 
 Athanasios Kostoulas (born 1976), Greek footballer
 Athanasios Mantzouranis (born 1982), Greek cyclist
 Athanasios Michalopoulos (born 1973), Greek beach volleyball player
 Athanasios Nanopoulos, Greek fencer
 Athanasios Skaltsogiannis (born 1873), Greek hurdler and long jumper
 Athanasios Skourtopoulos (born 1965), Greek basketball player
 Athanasios Stoikos (born 1988), Greek footballer
 Athanasios Tsigas (born 1982), Greek footballer
 Athanasios Vouros, Greek fencer
 Thanasis Antetokounmpo (born 1992), Greek basketball player
 Thanasi Kokkinakis, Australian tennis player

Other 
 Athanasios of Emesa, 6th-century Byzantine jurist
 Athanasius (praetorian prefect), 6th-century Byzantine official
 Afanasy Nikitin, Russian merchant, one of the first Europeans to travel to and document his visit to India. Died 1472.
 Athanasios Lefkaditis (1872–1944), founder of Greek Scouting
 Athanasios Papoulis (1921–2002), Greek-American engineer
 Athanasios Polychronopoulos (born 1984), Greek-American professional poker player

See also 
 Thanasis, a given name
 Thanos (name), a given name and a surname
 Afanasy, the Russian form of Athanasios
 Athanase, a given name
 Atanasio, a given name

References 

Given names of Greek language origin
Greek masculine given names

it:Atanasio
sr:Атанасије